Asokavanam is a 2001 Tamil-language thriller film written and directed by Thakkali Srinivasan. The film stars Sriman, Livingston, Rajashree, and Riyaz Khan, while Master Mahendran and Baby Jennifer appear in supporting roles. Featuring music composed by Deva, the film was released on 12 October 2001.

Cast
Sriman as Madhu
Livingston as Selvam
Riyaz Khan as Mohan
Rajashree as Uma
Mohan Raman as Sadasivam
Abhishek Shankar
Master Mahendran as Rahul
Baby Jennifer as Priya

Release
A reviewer from The Hindu noted "the script is good in the first half but sags in the second", adding "the director has not done much to sustain the viewers' interest or to keep them guessing". Balaji Balasubramaniam of BBthots.com wrote the film was "a rare entry in the horror genre, this movie too flatters to deceive" and that "it was a thriller that draws us in with the right setup and has some good ideas but disappoints in its pacing and execution".

References

2001 films
2000s Tamil-language films
Indian thriller films
2001 thriller films